Pholadidea is a taxonomic genus of marine bivalve molluscs in the subfamily Martesiinae  of the family Pholadidae (the piddocks). Most members of Pholididea bore into shale, soft rock and coral for shelter, with the exception of Pholididea (Hatasia) wiffenae, which is a wood-borer.

Appearance

The Pholididea are distinguished from the other genera in Martesiinae by having only on umbonal-ventral sulcus, a longitudinally-divided mesoplax, and either no metaplax and hypoplax, or a single plate caused by deposition of calcite in the periostratum.

Occurrence
Pholididea is known from the Eocene to the Holocene, while the subgenus P. (Hatasia) is known only from the Holocene. Species have been reported from the Palaeocene and Late Cretaceous, but these likely belong in other genera.

Taxonomy
The following taxonomic classifications exist in Pholididea:

Subgenera
 Pholadidea (Pholadidea) Turton, 1819
 Pholadidea (Hatasia) Gray, 1851

Species
 Pholadidea acherontea Beu & Climo, 1974
 Pholadidea eborensis Cosel & Haga, 2018
 Pholadidea fauroti Jousseaume, 1888
 † Pholadidea finlayi Laws, 1936 
 Pholadidea loscombiana Turton, 1819
 Pholadidea melanura .B. Sowerby I, 1834
 Pholadidea quadra G.B. Sowerby I, 1834
 Pholadidea suteri Lamy, 1926
 Pholadidea tridens Gray, 1843
 Pholadidea tubifera G.B. Sowerby I, 1834
 † Pholadidea wiffenae Crampton, 1990 

 Synonyms
 Pholadidea acutithyra Tchang, Tsi & Li, 1960 accepted as Penitella acutithyra Tchang, Tsi & Li, 1960
 Pholadidea cheveyi Lamy, 1927 accepted as Aspidopholas ovum W. Wood, 1828
 Pholadidea chishimana Habe, 1955 accepted as Penitella gabbii Tryon, 1863
 Pholadidea dolichothyra Tchang, Tsi & Li, 1960 accepted as Penitella dolichothyra <small>Tchang, Tsi & Li, 1960</small
 Pholadidea esmeraldensis Olsson, 1961: synonym of Pholadidea tubifera (G. B. Sowerby I, 1834)
 Pholadidea minuscula Dall, 1908 accepted as Martesia fragilis Verrill & Bush, 1898
 Pholadidea sagitta Dall, 1916 accepted as Penitella penita Conrad, 1837

References

 Coan, E. V.; Valentich-Scott, P. (2012). Bivalve seashells of tropical West America. Marine bivalve mollusks from Baja California to northern Peru. 2 vols, 1258 pp.

External links
 Turton, W. (1819) A Conchological Dictionary of the British Islands. J. Booth, London, xxvii + 272 pp., 28 pls
 Leach W. E. (1852). Molluscorum Britanniae Synopsis. A synopsis of the Mollusca of Great Britain arranged according to their natural affinities and anatomical structure. London pp. VIII + 376

Pholadidae
Bivalve genera